S. Leigh Savidge III is an American screenwriter, film producer, director, and founder of Xenon Pictures, a production and licensing company.

Career

In 2001, Savidge wrote and produced Welcome to Death Row, a documentary about Death Row Records, which was later turned into a book of the same name. He is known for his works in the restored version of The Harder They Come (restored in 2006)  and Straight Outta Compton (2015), for which he co-wrote the original draft of the screenplay and also served as one of its executive producers. His 2001 documentary Welcome to Death Row was shopped as a feature-length sequel to Straight Outta Compton on the heels of its success, and Savidge received a nomination for Best Original Screenplay at the 88th Academy Awards.

He founded the production company Xenon Pictures in 1986.

Filmography

As a producer
 2015: Straight Outta Death Row (Documentary) (executive producer)  
 2015: Straight Outta Compton (co-executive producer)  
 2011: Biebermania! (Video documentary) (executive producer)  
 2010: The 1984 Los Angeles Comedy Competition with Host Jay Leno (Video) (producer)  
 2008: Straight Outta Puerto Rico: Reggaeton's Rough Road to Glory(Video) (executive producer - as Leigh Savidge)  
 2006: The Harder They Come (restored version) (executive producer)
 2005: The Luau (executive producer)  
 2004: Eminem AKA (Video documentary) (executive producer)  
 2003: Malibooty! (Video) (executive producer)  
 2003: The Legend of Dolemite: Bigger & Badder (Video documentary) (executive producer)  
 2002: Flatland (TV Series) (executive producer - 1 episode)  
 2001: Welcome to Death Row (Video documentary) (executive producer)  
 2000: Rudy Ray Moore: Live at Wetlands (Video) (co-executive producer)  
 1997: Mahalia Jackson: The Power and the Glory (executive producer)  
 1997: Mahalia Jackson Sings the Songs of Christmas (Documentary) (executive producer)  
 1994: Dr. Martin Luther King, Jr.: A Historical Perspective (Documentary) (executive producer)  
 1994: The Legend of Dolemite (Documentary) (producer)   
 1990: Twisted Justice (executive producer)

As a director
 2010: The 1984 Los Angeles Comedy Competition with Host Jay Leno (Video) 
 2008: Straight Outta Puerto Rico: Reggaeton's Rough Road to Glory (Video) (as Leigh Savidge) 
 2001: Welcome to Death Row (Video documentary)

As a writer
 2015: Straight Outta Compton (story)
 1994: The Legend of Dolemite

As an editor
 1986: The Supernaturals (assistant editor) 
 1986: The Ladies Club (assistant editor - as Leigh Savidge)

Other credits
 2002: Biggie and Tupac (Documentary special thank)

Accolades

References

External links
 

Living people
Year of birth missing (living people)
American male screenwriters